Gargilesse is an album by Florent Marchet released in 2004 on Universal Records.

Track listing
 "Levallois"
 "Tous Pareils"
 "Mes Nouveaux Amis"
 "Dimanche"
 "Je N'ai Pensé Qu'à Moi"
 "Le Meilleur De Nous Deux"
 "Avez-Vous Déjà Songé"
 "Gargilesse"
 "Le Terrain De Sport"
 "Fantome"
 "Je M'en Tire Pas Mal"
 "Les Grandes Vacances"

References

2004 albums